Carl Thamm (1 November 1874 – 4 July 1944) was an Australian cricketer. He played in one first-class match for South Australia in 1902/03.

See also
 List of South Australian representative cricketers

References

External links
 

1874 births
1944 deaths
Australian cricketers
South Australia cricketers
Cricketers from Adelaide